The Dallas Fantasy Fair was an annual multi-genre fan convention held between 1982 and 1995 in Dallas, Texas. From 1989 until the show's demise in 1996, it was the home of the Harvey Award ceremonies. During its heyday, the show was one of the largest comics conventions in the country, third in attendance behind the San Diego Comic-Con and the Chicago Comicon.

Most Dallas Fantasy Fairs took place over three days, From Friday to Sunday. The convention featured a large range of pop culture elements, primarily comic books but also science fiction/fantasy, film/television, animation, anime, manga, toys, horror, and collectible card games. Along with panels, seminars, and workshops with comic book professionals, the Dallas Fantasy Fair often featured previews of upcoming films, and such evening events as a costume contest. The convention featured a large floorspace for exhibitors, including comic book dealers and collectibles merchants.

The show included an autograph area, as well as the Artists' Alley where comics artists signed autographs and sold or produced free sketches. (Despite the name, Artists' Alley could include writers and even glamour models.) Organizer Lankford was known for his generosity in regards to Artists' Alley, often giving even marginal creators free tables at the convention.

History
Antecedents to the Dallas Fantasy Fair included the Southwesterncon, held alternately in Dallas (where it was known as "D-Con") and Houston (where it was known as "Houstoncon") in the late 1960s and 1970s. D-Con '79 was produced by Larry Lankford (born 1960–died Dec. 25, 2013) who went on three years later to found the Dallas Fantasy Fair.

The first Dallas Fantasy Fair was held over four days from June 10–13, 1982, by Lankford's Bulldog Productions, the business name.  The Fantasy Fair programming coordinator was Paul McSpadden. (McSpadden later went on to become coordinator of the Harvey Awards.)

In the early years of the show, from 1984–1986, the convention was held over Independence Day weekend. In 1986, an additional show was added to the fall season, over Thanksgiving weekend.

In 1988, Bulldog Productions held three iterations of the Fantasy Fair, in the spring, summer, and fall. Throughout the summer of 1988, in addition to the Dallas-based conventions, Lankford put on two-day conventions in Austin, Houston, and San Antonio. The Austin event (also known as the Austin Fanfair) became an annual affair in the late 1980s, typically attracting 500–600 attendees (the Dallas convention, meanwhile, averaged about 2,500 visitors).

Mark Walters, promoter of the later Dallas-area convention the "Dallas Comic & Toy Fest" aka "Dallas Comic Show" (est. 2000), and co-promoter of the "Dallas Comic Con" (est. 2002), attended his first convention at the 1990 Fantasy Fair; he soon went to work for Lankford and eventually rose to be his second-in-command. 

In 1989–1993, Bulldog Productions put on monthly one-day "Dallas Minicons" in the area which generally attracted about 500 attendees per show.

The March 1993 presentation of the Harvey Awards at the Fantasy Fair occurred shortly after the death of the award's namesake Harvey Kurtzman; much of the show was in the form of a fund-raiser to help pay for the continuance of the awards. (That year there was also a Dallas Fantasy Fair held from June 18–20.)

The 1994 summer edition of the Dallas Fantasy Fair was held at Dallas Market Hall, and saw record attendance for the show, hitting 9,500 attendees.  At the time it was the third-largest show in the United States behind San Diego Comic-Con and Chicago Comic Con.

In 1995, Bulldog put on three iterations of the show, in April, August (when the Harvey Awards were presented), and November.  The summer show featured such guests as Rob Liefeld, Jaime Hernandez, Al Williamson, Alex Ross, James O'Barr, and Jim Steranko.

Demise 
The 1996 show, scheduled for July 27–28 at Market Hall, in Dallas, was cancelled on short notice due to money management issues. (The Harvey Awards which were scheduled to be presented there were never publicly presented, instead being mailed to the winners.) The Dallas Collectors Con was put together as a substitute event at the Plano Centre in suburban Plano, Texas, coordinated by Bobby Briggs and Bruce Spiegelman and then joined by John Fairless, J. David Spurlock, and James Mayfield, with official guests Bernie Wrightson, Bill Sienkiewicz, Howard Cruse, Rob Liefeld, and Kurt Busiek.

Locations and dates

References

External links 
 Complex City Conventions page on the Dallas Fantasy Fair
 Tribute to DFF organizer Larry Lankford on his death

Defunct comics conventions
Festivals in Dallas
Conventions in Texas
Defunct science fiction conventions in the United States
Recurring events established in 1982
1982 establishments in Texas